Bharat Rangachary was an Indian film director and producer of Bollywood. He has directed several successful films like Zameen Aasmaan, Baat Ban Jaye, Waqt Hamara Hai and Takkar. He died on 4 July 1995, in Bombay due to cancer. His last film Takkar was released shortly after his death. He started his career as an assistant director with Hrishikesh Mukherjee. He was also acclaimed for his direction of TV series Subah on Doordarshan.

Selected filmography
 Zameen Aasmaan - 1984
 Baat Ban Jaye - 1986 
 Khatarnaak - 1990
 Zulm Ki Hukumat - 1992
 Waqt Hamara Hai - 1993
 Hanste Khelte - 1994
 Takkar - 1995

References

External links

1953 births
Film directors from Mumbai
Hindi-language film directors
1995 deaths
20th-century Indian film directors